Lee Child (born 28 September 1974) is a former professional rugby league footballer who played in the 1990s.

International honours
Child won four caps for Ireland between 1995 and 1998.

References

1974 births
Living people
English people of Irish descent
English rugby league players
Rugby league wingers
Wakefield Trinity players
Hull F.C. players
Hunslet R.L.F.C. players
Featherstone Rovers players
Ireland national rugby league team players